José-Ricardo de Jesús (born 7 May 1960) is a Puerto Rican former swimmer who competed in the 1976 Summer Olympics.

References

1960 births
Living people
Puerto Rican male swimmers
Puerto Rican male freestyle swimmers
Male medley swimmers
Olympic swimmers of Puerto Rico
Swimmers at the 1976 Summer Olympics
Swimmers at the 1979 Pan American Games
Central American and Caribbean Games gold medalists for Puerto Rico
Competitors at the 1978 Central American and Caribbean Games
Central American and Caribbean Games medalists in swimming
Pan American Games competitors for Puerto Rico